Boustead was a station on the Port Authority of Allegheny County's light rail network, located in the Beechview neighborhood of Pittsburgh, Pennsylvania. The street level stop was located on a small island platform in the middle of Broadway Avenue, through which the T travels along former streetcar tracks. The station served a densely populated residential area through which bus service is limited because of the hilly terrain.

Boustead was one of eleven stops closed on June 25, 2012 as part of a system-wide consolidation effort.

References

External links 

Port Authority T Stations Listings

Former Port Authority of Allegheny County stations
Railway stations in the United States opened in 1987
Railway stations closed in 2012
1987 establishments in Pennsylvania
2012 disestablishments in Pennsylvania